Ruakākā is a small town in the north of New Zealand approximately 30 kilometres south of Whangārei in the Bream Bay area. Originally a small beachside community, Ruakākā has seen development due to its proximity to the expansion of the country's only oil refinery at Marsden Point during the 1980s. A recently established timber processing plant at Marsden Point has further stimulated growth.

Geography

Naming
The name  comes from the Māori term , which means the nesting hole of the kākā (Nestor meridionalis), a native parrot that nests in cavities in hollow trees. The name of the locality was usually spelled "Ruakaka", without macrons, until the official name was changed in 2019.

Districts
The general area is made up of Ruakākā Beach, Ruakākā Township and Marsden Point. Other Bream Bay localities such as One Tree Point, Takahiwai and even Waipu are often included in general conversation regarding the area.

Ruakākā Beach lies near the mouth of the Ruakākā River which boasts a rare bird reserve and popular holiday parks. It is primarily a residential area made up of a mixture of permanent homes and beach shacks.

The Ruakākā Township was developed off the back of the Marsden Point Oil Refinery expansion in the 1980s where services were required to support the large influx of workers from all over the world involved in the project. A government requirement for a percentage of revenue invested in the project to be spent on the local community allowed for provision of services not common in communities this size (e.g. squash courts, sports grounds).

The Marsden Power Station Village was built to support the Marsden Power Stations (A & B) which have since been decommissioned. The area is now promoted as beachside living.

Beaches
The bay has beautiful sandy white beaches looking out towards Bream Head, the Hen and Chicken Islands, Mount Manaia and Sail Rock.

Demographics
Statistics New Zealand describes Ruakākā as a small urban area.

Ruakākā had a population of 2,586 at the 2018 New Zealand census, an increase of 579 people (28.8%) since the 2013 census, and an increase of 669 people (34.9%) since the 2006 census. There were 960 households, comprising 1,281 males and 1,302 females, giving a sex ratio of 0.98 males per female. The median age was 43.1 years (compared with 37.4 years nationally), with 525 people (20.3%) aged under 15 years, 420 (16.2%) aged 15 to 29, 1,101 (42.6%) aged 30 to 64, and 543 (21.0%) aged 65 or older.

Ethnicities were 77.7% European/Pākehā, 33.9% Māori, 4.8% Pacific peoples, 3.6% Asian, and 0.8% other ethnicities. People may identify with more than one ethnicity.

The percentage of people born overseas was 15.2, compared with 27.1% nationally.

Although some people chose not to answer the census's question about religious affiliation, 54.4% had no religion, 32.1% were Christian, 2.7% had Māori religious beliefs, 0.8% were Hindu, 0.1% were Muslim, 0.7% were Buddhist and 1.5% had other religions.

Of those at least 15 years old, 267 (13.0%) people had a bachelor's or higher degree, and 498 (24.2%) people had no formal qualifications. The median income was $26,000, compared with $31,800 nationally. 258 people (12.5%) earned over $70,000 compared to 17.2% nationally. The employment status of those at least 15 was that 870 (42.2%) people were employed full-time, 291 (14.1%) were part-time, and 87 (4.2%) were unemployed.

Climate
The region's geographical location results in warm humid summers and mild winters. Typical summer temperatures range from 22 °C to 26 °C (72 °F to 79 °F), some of the warmest in the country. Ground frosts are virtually unknown. The hottest months are January and February. Typical annual rainfall for the region is 1500 – 2000 mm. Winds year-round are predominantly from the southwest. Ruakākā has a warm version of the oceanic climate closely bordering on humid subtropical, a typical feature of Northland's climate.

History
The area of Ruakākā is located in Bream Bay which was named by Captain Cook during his first voyage to New Zealand when he visited the region on 25 November 1769. It was named due to the ease of capture of 90–100 bream fish soon after anchoring. The area was a location for the late 19th/early 20th century kauri gum digging trade.

Education
Bream Bay College is a secondary (years 7–13) school with a roll of  students.

Ruakākā School is a contributing primary (years 1–6) school.

Both schools are coeducational. Rolls are as of 

Ruakākā School opened in 1898 in North Ruakākā. Until 1916 it was a half-time school sharing a teacher with Mata School. The school moved to its present site in 1912. Bream Bay College started in 1972 as a Forms 3–7 (years 9–13) school on the site of Waipu District High School. It moved to Ruakākā in February 1974 and expanded to include Forms 1 and 2 (years 7–8).

Attractions and landmarks
 Ruakaka Race Course

Railway proposal 

A branch line railway to Marsden Point from Oakleigh on the North Auckland Line has recently been proposed.  This Marsden Point Branch will primarily serve freight interests, but the Northland Regional Land Transport Committee has suggested that passenger trains for commuters between Ruakākā and Whangārei are a long-term option.

References

External links
 Ruakaka – The heart of the Whangarei South Coast

Whangarei District
Populated places in the Northland Region